Franklin Farm may refer to the following locations in the United States:
Franklin Farm, Virginia, a census-designated place
Metcalf-Franklin Farm, a historic farm in Rhode Island
Dr. Franklin Hart Farm, a historic home and farm in North Carolina